Almost Goodbye is the fourth studio album by American country music artist Mark Chesnutt. His third album for MCA Records, it was also the third consecutive album to receive RIAA platinum certification in the United States. Four singles were released from this album, of which three — "It Sure Is Monday", "Almost Goodbye", and "I Just Wanted You to Know" — reached Number One on the Billboard Hot Country Songs charts. "Woman (Sensuous Woman)", a cover of the Don Gibson hit from 1972, served as the fourth single, and peaked at #21.

Track listing

Personnel

 Robert Charles – engineer, assistant engineer
 Mark Chesnutt – lead vocals
 Tom Flora – background vocals
 Pat Flynn – acoustic guitar
 Paul Franklin – steel guitar, slide guitar
 Mark Friego – assistant mixing
 Glenn Gordon – acoustic guitar
 Mark Hagen – assistant mixing
 Rob Hajacos – fiddle
 Owen Hale – drums
 Christopher Harris – background vocals
 David Hungate – bass guitar
 Larry Jeffries – assistant engineer
 Jana King – background vocals
 Paul Leim – drums
 Glenn Meadows – editing, mastering
 Steve Nathan – keyboards
 Warren Peterson – engineer
 Lynn Peterzell – percussion, mixing
 Hargus "Pig" Robbins – piano
 Matt Rollings – keyboards
 Brent Rowan – electric guitar
 John Wesley Ryles – background vocals
 Lisa Silver – background vocals
 Wayne Toups – squeezebox
 Biff Watson – acoustic guitar
 Bergen White – background vocals
 Dennis Wilson – background vocals
 Bob Wray – bass guitar
 Curtis Young – background vocals

Strings by the Nashville String Machine, conducted by Carl Gorodetzky and arranged by Bergen White.

Charts

Weekly charts

Year-end charts

References

1993 albums
Mark Chesnutt albums
MCA Records albums
Albums produced by Mark Wright (record producer)